Fairview is an historic home located near Fredericksburg, Virginia at 2020 Whitelake Drive. It is the largest of the historic homes in Spotsylvania County. The house was built in 1837 by Samuel Alsop, Jr. (1776-1859). Alsop was an architect and builder who designed a number of buildings in Spotsylvania including the Old Berea Church and Kenmore Woods (1829), which he built for his daughter.

After building homes for his daughters, Fairview was designed and constructed for Alsop himself. The Federal-style home is double-pile construction (meaning that there are two rooms between the front façade and the rear wall of the house). The site on which the home was built was originally . In the 1970s the land was subdivided for residences.

Fairview was added to the National Register of Historic Places in December 1993.

References

Further reading
National Register of Historic Places registration form for Fairview

Houses on the National Register of Historic Places in Virginia
Federal architecture in Virginia
Houses completed in 1837
Houses in Spotsylvania County, Virginia
National Register of Historic Places in Spotsylvania County, Virginia